Deiters is a surname. People with the surname include:

 Franz-Josef Deiters, German-born Australian literary scholar, associate professor in German Studies at Monash University
 Hermann Deiters (1833–1907), writer about music and educator
 Julie Deiters (born 1975), France-born Dutch field hockey player
 Otto Deiters (1834–1863), German neuroanatomist
 Peter Franz Ignaz Deiters (1804–1861), German lawyer and member of the 1848 Frankfurt Parliament

Surnames